TAS2R16 (taste receptor, type 2, member 16) is a human gene that encodes for a receptor that may play a role in the perception of bitterness.

The TAS2R16 gene is located on the long (q) arm of chromosome 7 at position 31.1 - 31.3, from base pair 122,228,764 to base pair 122,229,639.

Clinical significance 

Variants of this gene have been linked to an increased risk for alcohol dependence.

There is an East African origin for high salicin sensitivity, and thus sensitivity to bitterness in people from this region, with this phenotype matched to TAS2R16 variants.

See also 
 Taste receptor

References

Further reading

External links 
 
 

Human taste receptors